General Motors Customer Care and Aftersales (CCA), formerly GM Service Parts Operations (SPO), is a division of General Motors that supplies replacement parts, and automotive service through GM's network of Dealers. For Non-GM vehicles, ACDelco (a division of GM CCA) supplies replacement and repair parts for GM and Non-GM vehicles in over 100 countries around the world. GM Accessories (a division of CCA) supplies performance, functional, entertainment and appearance automotive accessories for all GM vehicle brands worldwide.

GM CCA is headquartered in Grand Blanc, Michigan. GM CCA is also the world headquarters of GM Goodwrench, the automotive service brand for Chevrolet, Buick, Pontiac, GMC, Cadillac and HUMMER.

References

Auto parts suppliers of the United States
Service and Parts Operations
Companies based in Genesee County, Michigan